Madras High School is a public high school in Madras, Oregon, United States.

Academics
In 2008, 71% of the school's seniors received a high school diploma. Of 231 students, 165 graduated, 36 dropped out, three received a modified diploma, and 27 were still in high school the following year.

Notable alumni
 Darrell Ceciliani, baseball outfielder for the Toronto Blue Jays
 Jacoby Ellsbury, baseball outfielder for the New York Yankees
 Pat Courtney Gold, fiber artist and basket weaver

References

High schools in Jefferson County, Oregon
Madras, Oregon
Public high schools in Oregon